{{DISPLAYTITLE:C13H16N2}}
The molecular formula C13H16N2 (molar mass : 200.279 g/mol) may refer to:

 Dexmedetomidine
 Medetomidine
 Pethidine intermediate A
 PNU-22394
 RU-28306
 Tetrahydrozoline